The 1972 AFC Asian Cup was the 5th edition of the men's AFC Asian Cup, a quadrennial international football tournament organised by the Asian Football Confederation (AFC), that was hosted in Thailand . The finals were held in Thailand between 7 May and 19 May 1972. It was won by Iran.

Qualification

 qualified as hosts but later withdrew.  replaced them later.

Squads

Venue

Group allocation matches

 Winners divided over different groups

Group stage

Group A

Group B

Knockout stage

Semi-finals

Third place play-off

Final

Goalscorers

5 goals
 Hossein Kalani
4 goals
 Ali Jabbari
 Park Lee-Chun
3 goals
 Doeur Sokhom
 Prapon Tantariyanond
2 goals
 Safar Iranpak
1 goal

 Parviz Ghelichkhani
 Ammo Yousif
 Sea Cheng Eang
 Sok Sun Hean
 Tes Sean
 Fayez Marzouq
 Ibrahim Duraiham
 Jawad Khalaf
 Mohammad Sultan
 Cha Bum-Kun
 Lee Hoi-Taek
 Park Su-Deok
 Supakit Meelarpkit

Final positions

References

External links
Details at RSSSF
FIFA results record, used to update dates and locations
AFC Report

 
AFC
AFC
AFC Asian Cup tournaments
International association football competitions hosted by Thailand
May 1972 sports events in Asia